San Michele Arcangelo is a Romanesque-style, Roman Catholic located in the center of Sermoneta, region of Lazio, Italy.

History and description
The stone church was putatively built in the 11th century atop the ruins of an ancient pagan temple. The facade is made of non-hewn, irregular stones and sports awkward elements such as a portico entering from the alley at a right angle. The nave is subdivided with two aisles. The church crypt has Romanesque-era frescoes by unknown authors. The organ is from the 18th century and the baptistry from 1603.

The church was once affiliated with a confraternity of flagellants known as the Battenti.

References

 
Romanesque architecture in Lazio
11th-century Roman Catholic church buildings in Italy